Fulk is an old European personal name, probably deriving from the Germanic folk ("people" or "chieftain"). It is cognate with the French Foulques, the German Volk, the Italian Fulco and the Swedish Folke, along with other variants such as Fulke, Foulkes, Fulko, Folco, Folquet, and so on.

However, the above variants are often confused with names derived from the Latin Falco ("falcon"), such as Fawkes, Falko, Falkes, and Faulques.

Counts of Anjou 
Fulk I, Count of Anjou (about 870–942), "the Red"
Fulk II, Count of Anjou (died 958), "the Good"
Fulk III, Count of Anjou (972–1040), "the Black"
Fulk IV, Count of Anjou (1043–1109), "le Réchin"
Fulk, King of Jerusalem (1089/1092–1143), "the Younger", also Count of Anjou

Christian saints and clergymen 
 Saint Foulques de Fontenelle (died 845), French saint and 21st abbot of Fontenelle
Guy Foulques, later known as Clement IV, Pope 1265–1268
Fulk (archbishop of Reims) (died 900), "the Venerable"
Fulcher of Chartres (born around 1059, died in or after 1127)
Patriarch Fulk of Jerusalem (died 1157), Latin Patriarch of Jerusalem
Fulco (bishop of Estonia), appointed 1165
Saint Fulk (lived in the 12th century), English saint
Fulk of Neuilly (died 1201), French preacher of the Fourth Crusade
Fulk of Pavia (1164–1229), Italian saint and Bishop of Piacenza, also known as Folco Scotti
Folquet de Marselha (c.1150–1231), also known as Fulk of Toulouse, Provençal troubadour and Bishop of Toulouse
Fulk Basset (died 1271), Bishop of London
Folke Johansson Ängel (died 1277), Archbishop of Uppsala
Fulke Lovell (died 1285), Bishop of London-elect
Foulques de Chanac (died 1349), Bishop of Paris

Medieval noblemen 
Fulco of Ireland (8th–9th century), Irish soldier serving Charlemagne
Fulke d'Aunou, also written Fulco and Foulques (1004-1080?), Baron of Aunou-le-Faucon, Normandy. Second cousin of William of Normandy and one of 30 knights named as present with William at the Battle of Hastings (1066), he was awarded lands around High Littleton, Somerset, England
Fulk Bertrand of Provence (died 1051), Count of Provence
Fulk of Vendôme (died 1066), Count of Vendôme, also known as Foulques l'Oison
Fulco I, Margrave of Milan (1070–1128), ancestor of the Italian branch of the House of Este
Fulk of Angoulême (died 1087 or 1089), Count of Angoulême
Fulco of Basacers (died after 1120), Italo-Norman knight
Fulk of Guînes (died 1125), Lord of Beirut
Fulk FitzRoy (1092–c. 1132), illegitimate son of Henry I of England
Fulk I FitzWarin (1115-70/71), of Whittington Castle
Falkes de Breauté (died 1226), Anglo–Norman soldier and nobleman
Fulk Baynard (died after 1226), English landholder and justice
Fulk FitzWarin (died 1258), English nobleman and outlaw
Foulques de Villaret (died 1327), Grand Master of the Knights Hospitaller
Fulk Bourchier, 10th Baron FitzWarin (1445–1479), English baron of the House FitzWarin

Other people 
Falquet de Romans (died after 1233), Provençal troubadour
Bertran Folcon d'Avignon (died after 1233), Provençal troubadour
Folco Portinari (died 1289), Italian banker
Folquet de Lunel (1244–c. 1300), Occitan troubadour
Fulke Greville, 1st Baron Brooke (1554–1628), English writer and statesman
Fulke Greville (1717–1806), youngest son of Henry Somerset, 1st Duke of Beaufort
Robert Fulke Greville (1751–1824), British Member of Parliament and courtier
Robert Fulke Greville (landowner) (1800–1867), politician, soldier and landowner
Fulke Greville-Nugent, 1st Baron Greville (1821–1883), Irish politician
Fulco Luigi Ruffo-Scilla (1840–1895), Italian cardinal
Folco de Baroncelli-Javon (1869–1943), French writer and cattle farmer
Fulco Ruffo di Calabria (1884–1946), Italian World War I flying ace
Fulco di Verdura (1898–1978), Italian jeweller.
Fulke Walwyn (1910–1991), British jockey and horse trainer
Folco Lulli (1912–1970), Italian actor
Folco Quilici (1930–2018), Italian film director and screenwriter

As surname 
William Fulke (1538–1589), English Puritan divine
Giovanni Fulco (1615–c. 1680), Italian baroque painter
Philip B. Fouke (1818–1876), American politician
George Clayton Foulk (1856–1893), American diplomat
William Foulke (footballer) (1874–1916), English footballer and cricketer 
Clay Fulks (1880–1964), American writer and politician
Robert Foulk (1908–1989), American actor
Harry Fouke (1913–1992), American athletic director
Joe Fulks (1921–1976), American baseball player
Jack Fulk (1932–2011), American businessman
Bill Foulkes (1932–2013), English footballer
William Fulco (1936–2021), American Jesuit priest and linguist
Raymonde Folco (born 1940), Canadian politician
Michel Folco (born 1943), French writer and photographer
Robert D. Fulk (born 1951), American philologist
Peter Folco (born 1953), Canadian ice hockey player
Robbie Fulks (born 1963), American country musician
Philippe Di Folco (born 1964), French author and teacher
Bettina Fulco (born 1968), Argentine tennis player
Pierre Fulke (born 1971), Swedish golfer
Alice Fulks (born 1982), American actress

See also 
Falco (disambiguation)
Fawkes
Folco
Folke (name)
Fulco (disambiguation)
Fulke